Rebecca Balding (September 21, 1948 – July 18, 2022) was an American actress best known for her appearances on Soap and Charmed.

Life and career
Balding was born in Little Rock, Arkansas. She attended the University of Kansas. She had the role of Carol David, mother of Jodie Dallas' child, on Soap, appearing in 19 episodes from 1978 through 1980. Balding played Corky Crandall in 1979 in the sitcom Makin' It, as well as the original female reporter Carla Mardigian during the first three episodes of the inaugural 1977 season of the drama series Lou Grant, starring Ed Asner, before that character was written out for a different female reporter. That same year she again appeared with Asner, playing his daughter Julie, in the classic Christmas TV film, The Gathering. Also in 1977, Balding played Amy Franklin in Deadly Game, a movie that starred Andy Griffith and James Cromwell. In 1980 she starred in the pilot of the sitcom Mr. and Mrs. and Mr., that was never progressed as a series. In 1996, she made a guest appearance on 7th Heaven as Ellen, the mother of Matt's new girlfriend Tia.

In 1998, Balding guest starred as Aunt Jackie in the season one episode "The Fourth Sister" of Charmed. She later returned to the show during its fourth season in 2002 under a different role. Balding played the recurring character Elise Rothman, a newspaper editor-in-chief and the boss of Phoebe Halliwell (played by Alyssa Milano). She played the role until the show's eighth and final season in 2006.

Balding was married to television producer James L. Conway, whom she met while auditioning for a part in the 1981 horror movie The Boogens, which Conway directed and in which Balding ultimately starred.

Balding died on July 18, 2022, at the age of 73, after having suffered from ovarian cancer.

Filmography

Film

Television

References

External links
 

1948 births
2022 deaths
21st-century American women
Actresses from Little Rock, Arkansas
American television actresses
University of Kansas alumni
Deaths from ovarian cancer 
Deaths from cancer in Utah